Egtved is a village with a population of 2,446 (as of 1 January 2022) near Vejle, Denmark in Vejle municipality in the Danish Region of Southern Denmark. Nearby is Tørskind Gravel Pit, a sculpture park.

The village has a Romanesque church built in 1170, to which a tower was added in 1863. The Egtved Runestone, found near the church in 1863, is now on display in the church.

Egtved Girl

Near the village is a Bronze Age archaeological site (ca. 1370 BC) which contained an extremely well-preserved burial. It was discovered in 1921 and is one of the best preserved Bronze Age findings in Denmark. It contained the well preserved body of a girl known as the Egtved Girl. On the site where she was found a barrow with a diameter of 22 metres and a height of 4 metres was built. The teenaged girl was dressed in a string skirt, a short sleeved shirt with a woven belt, and a bronze spiked belt disc. She was laid on a cow-hide and covered by a coarse woollen blanket. Lying next to her was a birch-bark drink container with remnants of a drink made of bog myrtle, cranberries and honey.

There is also a small museum describing the discovery of the rare find in detail and displaying copies of the Egtved Girl's clothing, jewellery and buckle. This has allowed a very close look at Nordic Bronze Age clothing and hairstyles.

Literature
C. Michael Hogan, Egtved Girl Barrow, The Megalithic Portal, editor A. Burnham, 4 October, 2007

Notable people 
 Poul Steenstrup (1772 in Egtved – 1864) a businessman, industrial entrepreneur and politician
 Peter Sørensen Vig (1854 in Bøgvad, Egtved Sogn - 1929) a Danish-American pastor, educator and historian in the Lutheran church
 Olaf Pedersen (1920 in Egtved – 1997) an authority on astronomy in classical antiquity and the Latin Middle Ages
 Mette Gravholt (born 1984 in Egtved) a retired Danish handball player who played 53 games for Denmark

References

External links

 Egtved Girl

Prehistoric sites in Denmark
Cities and towns in the Region of Southern Denmark
Vejle Municipality

et:Egtved
fo:Egtved kommuna
it:Egtved
nl:Egtved
no:Egtved
pl:Gmina Egtved
pt:Egtved
ru:Эгтвед
sv:Egtved kommun